The Flute sonata in A minor (HWV 374) is thought to have been composed by George Frideric Handel, for flute and basso continuo. The date of composition of the work is unknown, but it was first published in 1730. Other catalogues of Handel's music have referred to the work as HG xlviii, 130; and HHA iv/3,57.

The authenticity of the sonata is uncertain, however the work is written in a style that is characteristically Handelian. It is referred to as "Halle Sonata No. 1", and is sometimes called "Hallenser Sonaten" (following Chrysander's assumption that it was an early work). The Chrysander edition indicates that the work is for flute ("Traversa"), and published it as Sonata XVI.

A typical performance of the work takes about eleven and a half minutes.

Movements
The work consists of four movements:

(Movements do not contain repeat markings unless indicated. The number of bars is taken from the Chrysander edition, and is the raw number in the manuscript—not including repeat markings.)

See also
Handel flute sonatas
List of solo sonatas by George Frideric Handel
XV Handel solo sonatas (publication by Chrysander)

References

Flute sonatas by George Frideric Handel
Compositions in A minor